Geoje (Hanja: 巨濟) is a city located in South Gyeongsang province, just off the coast of the port city of Busan, South Korea. Daewoo Shipbuilding & Marine Engineering (former Daewoo Shipyard) in Okpo and Samsung Heavy Industries (SHI) in Gohyeon are both located on Geoje Island. The city also offers a wide range of tourist sights. The city is made up of a number of islands, of which by far the largest is Geoje Island. There are multiple
dong in the city: Jangpyeongdong, Okpo-dong and Gohyeon.

Etymology
Geoje is Korean for "great rescue", from the syllables "geo" meaning great, and "je" meaning rescue.

History
Geoje has a history stretching back thousands of years.  Various artifacts dating back to the Neolithic era have been found at archaeological digs on Naedo, Sandaldo, and Isudo. While no written history can be found from this era, the digs show evidence of numerous small establishments along the coasts.  The first written mention of Geoje appears as, Geoje being one of two main divisions of the Dokro kingdom, a member of the Byeonhan confederacy (circa 0-300 AD). The Byeonhan confederacy slowly gave way to the Gaya confederacy(42-562 AD). The Gaya eventually submitted to the Kingdom of Silla.

In 757, Gyeongdeok of Silla classified the island as "Geoje-gun" "" (Geoje county). Modern Geoje is classified as a "si" (city). In 1170, Uijong of Goryeo secretly escaped to Geoje when Jeong Jung-bu raised a rebellion against him, instating his brother, Myeongjong as king. Geoje served as a strategic location in preparation of the naval forces for the Gihae Eastern Expedition of Tsushima Island in 1419 by the Korean general Yi Jong Mu. At the time of the Seven-Year War in 1592, admiral Yi Sun-sin gained a great naval victory against Japanese invaders near the town of Okpo in Geoje. Since then. Yi was referred to by his noble title, "Chung Mu Gong," which roughly translates into English as "Earner of Great National Respect."

The prison was rife with human rights abuses, including summary execution and the widespread use of torture against prisoners by Canadian and American troops. British journalist Alan Winnington and Australian journalist Wilfred Burchett conducted extensive research to document these human rights abuses, and jointly published their findings in 1952. After the war, a portion (23,000 m2) was converted into a tourist attraction.

More recent and more thorough historical analysis, based largely on the accounts of people who were actually there, paints a much more complex picture of the violence in the camps by the ruling rioters, and the difficulties faced when the UN tried to regain control of the camp.

The Geneva Convention of 1949 failed to foresee to the development of hardcore, organized prisoner groups on Geoje-do in 1951-52 or to provide protection for the captor nation in dealing with stubborn resistance, mainly as a result of the harsh treatment that the prisoners received from the military government.

During the last few decades Geoje has emerged as leader in the shipbuilding industries. Due to the continued industry, Geoje largely escaped the negative impacts of the Asian market crash of 1997.

Some notable people from Geoje include: 
Former President Kim Young-sam
Poet Yu Chi-hwan, better known by his pen-name Cheongma.
President Moon Jae-in

Demographics
According to the whitebook published by Geoje City in May 2014, Geoje had a population of 243,736, 12,240 of which are foreigners (non-Koreans). A significant portion of the population depends on shipbuilding to support their livelihood, and this can be evidenced by the fact that nearly 33%  of workers are employed in the shipbuilding industry.

Tourism
Geoje offers a variety of attractions, including Haegeumgang island, Oedo, a marine western-style botanical garden in Hallyeo-Haesang National Park, built by Lee Chang-ho and his wife when they settled on the island in 1969.  Visitors visit by ferry boat from the harbor neighboring the islands.

Tourists also visit Jisim-do for trekking. Jisim is known for its Camellia vegetation. However, the Maemi typhoon in 2003 severely affected the island's plant life. Another popular tourist attraction at Haegeumgang-do (located southeast of Geoje) is the Sipja Donggul Cave. Buddhist and Shamanist sculptures can be found in the cave.

Geoje is the second largest island in Korea, so discovering these locations is most easily done using a tourist map.

Historic and Cultural Sites

Geoje POW Camp 
Geoje POW Camp was a prisoner of war detention camp for captured North Koreans established during the Korean war from (1951).  It was the site of a prison riot on May 8, 1952, which is the topic of Chinese-American writer Ha Jin's fictional War Trash.

Gohyeon Castle 

Gohyeon Castle is named the 46th national treasure of South Gyeongsang Province. Gohyeon Castle and is located in Gohyeondong, Geoje city. It was established during the Joseon dynasty in 1451.

In the famous Joseon era geography book, Donggukyeojiseungram, it was recorded that the Gohyeon castle had a circumference of 3,038 Cheok (equivalent to about ), and had a height of 13 Cheok. It was considered the largest castle in the South Sea.

Geoje Township Government Office 

The Geoje Township Government Office is regarded as Korea's 84th cultural treasure. During the time of the Japanese invasions, the office was established in 1470 to administer all military and shipbuilding plans.

Oksangeum Fortress Area 

The Oksangeum Fortress Area was an unsanctioned fortress built on the Sujeong peak to defend against Japanese invasion.  Due to the strain it placed on the people during the building, the magistrate responsible was dismissed. Oksangeum Fortress is regarded as the South Gyeongsang Province's 10th cultural treasure.

Pyewang Fortress 

Pyewang Fortress is the oldest surviving fortress in Geoje.  First built during the Silla Dynasty, Pyewang fortress later served the fortress refuge for the King Uijong the 18th king of the Goryeo dynasty, while escaping from a military coup. Pyewang fortress is located in Dundeok-myeon. Pyewang fortress is regarded as the South Gyeongsang Province's 11th cultural treasure, and National Historical Site no. 509.

Okpo Great Victory Park 
Okpo Great Victory Park is located in Okpo2Dong within Geoje city. It commemorates the great victory over the invading Japanese navy by the honored general Yi Sun-sin on May 7, 1592.

Blue Horse (Poet) Museum 
The Blue Horse (Cheongma) is a cultural exhibition and preserved birthplace museum of the celebrated poet "Blue Horse".  It is located in Bangha village, Dundeokmyeon.

Jisimdo 
Jisimdo is an island of the east coast of Geoje.  It is visited primarily for its vast amount of Camellia vegetation. Although damaged by Maemi typhoon, the camellias have mostly returned.  It is also a site of a Japanese military installation, from the occupation of the early 20th century.

Museums

Haegeumgang Theme Museum 
Haegeumgang Theme Museum is a museum of travel during the 1950s to the 1970s. It is located in Galgot village, Nambumyeon.

Geoje Shipbuilding Marine Cultural Center 
The Geoje Shipbuilding Marine Cultural Center is an independently established combination of a Fishing Village Folk Museum and Shipbuilding Theme park museum located in Jisepo village, Ilunmyeon.

The Fishing Village Folk Museum covers two floors, including 4 exhibits: "The living sea/Traditions of the sea" and "Ocean experience/Renaissance of the sea".

Shipbuilding Theme park museum also covers two floors, including 5 exhibits: "Children's Shipbuilding yard/Dock 1" The history of sailing vessels/Dock 2 Shipbuilding technology/Dock 3 The future of the oceans/ Movie theatre

Geoje Museum 
Geoje Museum is located in Okpo. It features local artifacts used over the centuries by the people of Geoje.

Natural Attractions

Hill of Wind 

The Hill of Wind is located in Galgot village, Nambumyeon. It overlooks South Sea and there is a strong wind. A windmill is set on top of hill. It became famous after 2 Days & 1 Night, where one of the most popular Korea TV shows was filmed.

Haegeumgang 

Haegeumgang is named for resemblance of the famous Haegeum mountain in North Korea. It is one of the most famous tourist destinations in all of Geoje.

Oedo and Naedo 

Oedo and Naedo are two islands located in the southeast of Geoje island and of the two, Oedo hosts the second most visited attraction in all of Geoje, the expansive botanical gardens of Botania.

Sanbangsan Botanical Garden 
Sanbangsan Botanical Garden is a botanical garden in Sanbang-ri.  This garden has many flower and tree varieties.  Due to its remote location, it is much less busy than other botanical gardens.

Mundong Waterfall 
Mundong Waterfall is a small waterfall located above the Mundong Reservoir.  It features trails and picnic areas at this location.

Gonggoji 
Gonggoji is a mountain side garden located opposite Naedo island. It features Camellia trees, and daffodil fields.  Due to there being no road access, you must walk to get to this location.

Beaches

Shipbuilding 

There are various shipbuilding docks which provide tours from the Daewoo and Samsung corporation located in both Gohyeon and Okpo.

Resorts

Daemyeong Resort 
Daemyeong Resort is located in Ilun-myeon.  It has various rooms.  It offers a choice of several restaurants, karaoke rooms, billiards, table tennis and other entertainment options.  There also the Ocean Bay Water Park on location, and the Marina Bay offers yacht and motor boat rentals.

Other Recreational Activities 
Geoje offers an abundance of trails that can be used to hike, cycle, and some are suitable for ATV use.

Administrative divisions

According to a 2014 study, Geoje's Korean population was 243,736, and the foreign national population was 12,240. Although Gohyeon-dong is the fifth smallest of the dongs, it is the largest in population at 40,400.
The cumulative area of Geoje is 402.3 km2, with Dongbu-myeon being the widest, and Majeon-dong being the narrowest.

In 2008 Shinhyeon-eup was abolished, and in its place a new town was installed. It now divided into the separate dongs of Gohyeon-dong, Jangpyeong-dong, Sangmundong-dong, and Suyang-dong

The industrial area of Geoje has the highest man to women worker ratio in South Gyeongsang.

Geography
The main island is joined to land by two bridges from nearby Tongyeong. It is also connected via a series of bridges and underwater tunnels to Gadeok (가덕), then Busan (부산), named the Geoga Great Bridge(거가대교). A proposal has been made to connect Geoje to Masan(마산) by another set of bridges and tunnels named Yi Sun-sin Great Bridge (이순신대교).

Climate
Geoje experiences a humid subtropical climate (Köppen: Cfa/Cwa), and temperatures reaching below zero degrees Celsius in winter are frequent during December to February. However, the island is kept relatively warm by the influence of warm ocean currents.

On 2022, Typhoon Hinnamnor made landfall over the city, the eye centre directly passed over the city as a category 2 at 5:50 AM September 6th 2022. Leaving severe destruction around, including flooding.

Produce
Due to Geoje's coastal sub-tropical location, the area grows and harvests several different crops, some of which are uncommon in most of Korea. Some of these crops include yuja, pineapples, and mushrooms.

Being an island also provides an abundance of seafood that is collected locally.

Islands of Geoje city

 Geoje
 Oedo
 Galgotdo (Haegeumgang)
 Chilcheondo
 Jisimdo
 Gajodo
 Haegando
 Sandaldo
 Hawdo

Education
There is an international school, International School of Koje (거제국제외국인학교).

Sister cities
  Longjing, Jilin, China
  Qinhuangdao, Hebei, China
  Qidong, Jiangsu, China
  Guam, United States
  Yame, Fukuoka, Japan

Domestic
 Gurye County, South Jeolla Province
 Hadong County, South Gyeongsang Province

See also
 List of cities in South Korea
 Geography of South Korea
Geoje POW camp

References

External links

 
 City government website
 - Tourism website for Expats

 

 
Cities in South Gyeongsang Province
Port cities and towns in South Korea